True Meanings is the fourteenth studio album by English singer-songwriter Paul Weller, released on 14 September 2018.

Music
True Meanings has been noted for its stripped-back, acoustic sound. The album's sound has been described as folk rock.

Reception

According to Metacritic, the album has received a score of 79/100 based on 11 reviews from critics, indicating "generally favorable reviews".

Track listing
All songs written by Paul Weller, except track 1 (Weller/O'Brien), tracks 8,9 & 14 (Weller/Cooper) and track 12 (Weller/Brown/Doyle).

Personnel
Paul Weller – Vocals (1-14), Acoustic Guitar (1,3,5,7), Electric Guitar (1,3), Wurlitzer (1), Guitar (2,4,6,8-14), Piano (3,5,8,9,12), Hammond (3,14), Mellotron (6,9,14), Backing Vocals (7), Harmonium (8), Vibes (9), Melodica (10), Hand Pump Organ (11), Bells (11)
Jo Allen - Strings (4)
Rod Argent - Hammond Solo (1), Mellotron (14), Piano (14)
Lizzie Ball - Strings (4)
Natalia Bonner - Strings (4)
Maxine Boxall - BVs (1)
Steve Brooks - Lead Guitar (3)
Anth Brown - Bass (12), Acoustic Guitar (12)
Barrie Cadogan - Lead Guitar (5)
Martin Carthy - Backing Vocals (10), Guitar (10)
Erland Cooper - Backing Vocals (7-9,14)
Jessica Cox - Strings (2)
Steve Cradock - 12 String Guitar (2,6), Autoharp (2), Acoustic Guitar (7)
Andy Crofts - Backing Vocals (4,7), String Arrangement (4,5), Bass (5,6), Acoustic Guitar (7), Nashville Tuned Guitar (7)
Rosie Danvers - Strings (4)
Paloma Deike - Strings (2)
Tom Doyle - Drums (12), Wurlitzer (12), Mellotron (12), Hammond (12)
Isabelle Dunn - Strings (1,5,8-10,12,14), Extra Cello (7)
Noel Gallagher – Harmonium (11), Space Hammond (14)
Danielle Ganeva - Vibraphone (12)
Ben Gordelier - Drums (5,6)
Tom Heel - Backing Vocals (1,6,12), Rhodes Piano (6)
Becky Jones - Strings (4)
Jan Stan Kybert - Percussion (1), Glockenspiel (14)
Sheema Murkajee - Sitar (11),Tampoura (11), Vocals (11)
Conor O'Brien - Vocals (1), Bass (1), Drums (1), Mini-Moog (1), Rhodes (1)
Stella Page - Strings (1,5,8-10,12,14)
Antonia Pagulatos - Strings (1,5,8-10,12,14)
Hannah Peel - String Arrangements and conducting (1,5,7-10,12,14), Strings performer (7)
Steve Pilgrim - Vocals (2), Guitar (2,4,6), Backing Vocals (4,6,7), Acoustic Guitar (7)
Hayley Pomfrett - Strings (4)
Charles Rees - Programming (3), Electric Organ (5), Bass Synth (9)
Lucy Rose - Vocals (11)
Katono Sato - Strings (1,4,5,8-10,12,14), Solo Violin (2)
Kamalbir Singh Nandra - Violin (11)
Amy Stanford - Strings (2)
Ellie Stanford - Strings (4)
Laura Stanford - String Arrangement (2), Strings (2)
Chris Storr - Trumpet (3,12,14), Flugel (3,6,12,14)
The Stuart Kennedy Orchestra - String Arrangement (13), Strings (13)
Danny Thompson - Double Bass (10)
Phil Veacock - Horn Arrangement (3,12,14), Tenor Saxophone (3,12,14), Baritone Saxophone (3,12,14)
Alistair White - Trombone (3,12,14)
White Label - String Arrangement (12), Horn Arrangement (12)

Charts

Year-end charts

References

2018 albums
Paul Weller albums
Parlophone albums